This is a list of the men's American weightlifting champions since 1928.

National Champions (1973-2022)
As of 1 July 2022

National Champions Press, Snatch, and Clean & Jerk (1928-1972)
As of 14 May 2019

Multiple champions
As of 2 July 2021

See also
 List of United States women's national weightlifting champions

References

Weightlifting
National champions
Men's national champions
Weightlifting 
Weightlifting champions
Lists of weightlifters
Lists of sports medalists
National weightlifting championships